Crawfish Creek is a short stream in Yellowstone National Park in the U.S. state of Wyoming  This watercourse is known for its unusually warm temperatures compared to other surface water bodies in Wyoming;  these elevated temperatures enable crawfish to thrive in the water.  Summer water temperatures are in the range of 22 to 24 degrees Celsius; pH levels are typically about 9.1, or somewhat alkaline.  The warm waters come from a southern portion of the Yellowstone volcanic zone which produces hot water from hot springs and fumaroles in the area.  The stream feeds into the Lewis River just south of the Lewis River Canyon and just before the Lewis River converges with the Snake River.

The watershed of Crawfish Creek is densely forested with lodgepole pine, Douglas fir and other tree species.

Notes

External links
Photo of Crawfish Creek, Yellowstone Park

Rivers of Wyoming
Rivers of Yellowstone National Park
Rivers of Teton County, Wyoming